Miss Languedoc-Roussillon is a French beauty pageant which selects a representative for the Miss France national competition from the region of Languedoc-Roussillon. The first Miss Languedoc-Roussillon was crowned in 1928, although several women have represented the region with various other titles in the years since. Since 2022, the region has been divided into the individual Miss Languedoc and Miss Roussillon regional pageants.

The current Miss Languedoc is Cameron Vallière, who was crowned Miss Languedoc 2022 on 5 August 2022, while the current Miss Roussillon is Chiara Fontaine, who was crowned Miss Roussillon 2022 on 7 August 2022. Four women from Languedoc-Roussillon have been crowned Miss France:
Madeleine Mourgues, who was crowned Miss France 1929
Annie Garrigues, who was crowned Miss France 1938, competing as Miss Roussillon
Myriam Stocco, who was crowned Miss France 1971
Alexandra Rosenfeld, who was crowned Miss France 2006, competing as Miss Languedoc

Results summary
Miss France: Madeleine Mourgues (1928); Annie Garrigues (1937; Miss Roussillon); Myriam Stocco (1970); Alexandra Rosenfeld (2005; Miss Languedoc)
1st Runner-Up: Martine David (1978; Miss Languedoc); Florence Dourdou (1979; Miss Languedoc); Cathy Billaudeau (1985; Miss Languedoc); Jenna Sylvestre (2010; Miss Languedoc); Aurore Kichenin (2016)
2nd Runner-Up: Stéphane Bracher (1986; Miss Camargue)
3rd Runner-Up: Rouja Chanon (1992; Miss Camargue)
4th Runner-Up: Violette Pena (1968; Miss Toulouse-Languedoc); Katherina Navegand (1980; Miss Roussillon); Lætitia Guirodou (1983; Miss Languedoc); Nathalie Huc (1987; Miss Roussillon); Florence Olivier (1989; Miss Littoral Sud); Sandra Praduroux (1992; Miss Littoral Sud)
5th Runner-Up: Laure Mazon (2003; Miss Camargue-Cévennes)
6th Runner-Up: Estelle Rouquette (2000; Miss Cévennes); Alison Cossenet (2011; Miss Languedoc)
Top 12/Top 15: Roseline Casal (1987; Miss Grande Motte); Anne-Laure Bastide (1995; Miss Cévennes); Céline Gimbert (1997; Miss Languedoc); Céline Torrès (1997; Miss Camargue); Sabrina Dubois (1999; Miss Cévennes); Raphaelle Navarro (2000; Miss Languedoc); Agnès Fouques (2001; Miss Languedoc); Cindy Martinez (2004; Miss Camargue-Cévennes); Marie-Charlotte Méré (2005; Miss Camargue-Cévennes); Marion Castaing (2010; Miss Roussillon); Julie Vialo (2011; Miss Roussillon); Marilou Cubaynes (2012; Miss Roussillon); Anaïs Franchini (2013; Miss Languedoc); Sabine Banet (2013; Miss Roussillon); Sheana Vila Real (2014; Miss Roussillon); Léna Stachurski (2015; Miss Languedoc); Alizée Rieu (2017); Lola Brengues (2018); Marion Ratié (2021); Cameron Vallière (2022; Miss Languedoc); Chiara Fontaine (2022; Miss Roussillon)

Titleholders

Miss Languedoc
In several editions of Miss France, the departments of Aude, Gard, Hérault, and Lozère have competed separately under the title Miss Languedoc.

Miss Roussillon
In several editions of Miss France, the department of Pyrénées-Orientales has competed separately under the title Miss Roussillon.

Miss Camargue
From the 1980s to 2000s, the region also crowned a representative under the title Miss Camargue.

Miss Cévennes
From the 1990s to 2000s, the region also crowned a representative under the title Miss Cévennes.

Miss Littoral Sud
From the 1980s to 1990s, the region also crowned a representative under the title Miss Littoral Sud.

Miss Grande Motte
From the 1970s to 1980s, the region also crowned a representative under the title Miss Grande Motte.

Miss Camargue-Cévennes
From 2003 to 2005, the region also crowned a representative under the title Miss Camargue-Cévennes.

Miss Lozère
In 1970, the department of Lozère crowned its own representative for Miss France.

Miss Toulouse-Languedoc
In 1968, the regions of Languedoc-Roussillon and Midi-Pyrénées crowned a shared representative under the title Miss Toulouse-Languedoc.

Notes

References

External links

Miss France regional pageants
Beauty pageants in France
Women in France